Danny Wynter (born 25 May 1982), known professionally as Danny Lee Wynter, is a British actor, playwright, and activist. He is best known for playing the lead in Stephen Poliakoff's BBC films Joe's Palace and Capturing Mary, alongside Sir Michael Gambon and Dame Maggie Smith, and also for appearing in Dominic Cooke’s 2021 National Theatre revival of The Normal Heart, for which he was nominated for an Olivier Award for Best Supporting Actor. 

Mainly recognised for his stage work, Lee Wynter began his professional training while ushering at The Royal Court Theatre.

Primarily through an actors perspective, Lee Wynter has written many articles on the topic of diversity, addressing issues of race, class, disability and gender within TV, theatre, art, history, sexuality and mass media. His writing has appeared in numerous publications including The Stage Newspaper, The Huffington Post, The Guardian and The Evening Standard. Between 2017 and 2018 he was a columnist for the gay publication Attitude (magazine).

He is founder of the Act For Change Project, the campaigning group and charitable organisation which helped contribute to the large shift in diversity and representation in the U.K live and recorded arts from the mid twenty-tens onwards.

In 2022 The Royal Court Theatre announced it will stage his debut play, Black Superhero, as part of their Autumn/Winter season on their main stage in March 2023.

Biography

Lee Wynter was born in Barking, East London and grew up in a single parent family in Essex. His mother, a train attendant, is of Romany Gypsy and Italian ancestry, and his father, a local businessman, is of Jamaican descent.  He has been open about his sexuality since the beginning of his career identifying as gay.

In 2000, Lee Wynter studied performing arts at Middlesex University, where he trained in clown under John Wright, founder of Trestle Theatre Company and As Told By An Idiot. In 2003, he gained a place at the London Academy of Music and Dramatic Art to train in classical acting. During this period he ushered at The Royal Court theatre, a job which he left to make his professional debut in Stephen Poliakoff's 2007 BBC/HBO films Joe's Palace and Capturing Mary.

After receiving acclaim for his performance in the Poliakoff films Lee Wynter was cast by Dominic Dromgoole as the Fool to David Calder's King Lear for Shakespeare's Globe. His other work for the company includes Henry IV Part I and II, opposite Roger Allam, and new plays The Frontline by Che Walker and Bedlam by Nell Leyshon. He also appeared as the titular character in Milton's Comus in the Wanamaker Playhouse.

Theatre work includes The Glass Menagerie for the Nuffield Theatre, Southampton, Deathwatch for The Print Room at The Coronet Theatre, Notting Hill, The Maids for HOME Theatre, Manchester, Forty Years On for Chichester Festival Theatre, Cell Mates for Hampstead Theatre, Faustus: That Damned Woman for Headlong Theatre, The Living Newspaper and The Changing Room for The Royal Court, The Miser for The Royal Exchange Manchester, St. John’s Night for Jermyn Street Theatre, Much Ado About Nothing for  The Old Vic Theatre Company (directed by Sir Mark Rylance), and the National Theatre’s revival of The Normal Heart, for which he was nominated for an Olivier Award. 

On screen he has appeared in Hot Fuzz, Trial & Retribution, Luther, Holby City, Episodes, Mr Stink, Beat Girl, Partners In Crime , Walliams and Friend and Censor.

In January 2014, after responding to a trailer for a new season of TV drama which failed to include a single BAME artist, Lee Wynter brought together a group of friends and colleagues, actresses Ruth Wilson and Stephanie Street, actor and director Daniel Evans, casting director Andy Pryor and actors Malcolm Sinclair and Kobna Holdbrook-Smith to send out the message that the UK arts must reflect everyone regardless of race, gender, class, sexual orientation or disability. What started as a handful of voices soon became the Act for Change project. The organisations first public event was a sold out debate chaired by Baroness Shami Chakrabarti, then of the human rights group, Liberty. Held at London's Young Vic Theatre, the pilot debate was attended by various leading industry figures, including the Head of ITV Drama. Unprecedented public support followed and Act For Change was formed as a way of "drawing attention to the lack of equality that exists within the UK live and recorded arts." In 2015 The Act For Change Project became a registered charity.

Stage and film performances
 Hot Fuzz 2006 (Film)
 Trial & Retribution 2006 (TV Series)
 The Changing Room 2006 (Stage Play)
 Joe's Palace 2007 (Film)
 Capturing Mary 2007 (Film)
 The Fall of the House of Usher 2007 (Stage Play)
 King Lear 2008 (Stage Play)
 The Frontline 2008 (Stage Play)
 4 4.68 2008 (Radio Play)
 A Doll's House 2008 (Stage Play)
 Holby City (2009) (TV Series)
 Certain Young Men 2009 (Stage Play)
 The Miser 2009 (Stage Play)
 Gone 2010 (Radio Play)
 Luther 2010 (TV series)
 Henry IV Part I 2010 (Stage Play)
 Henry IV Part II 2010 (Stage Play)
 Bedlam 2010 (Stage Play)
 Beat Girl 2012 (Film)
 St. John's Night 2012 (Stage Play)
 Mr Stink 2012 (TV Drama)
 Partners in Crime 2015 (TV Series)
 Censor'' 2021 (Film)

References

External links

Living people
1982 births
Alumni of the London Academy of Music and Dramatic Art
Black British male actors
English people of Italian descent
English people of Jamaican descent
English male stage actors
English male television actors
English male Shakespearean actors
People from Barking, London
LGBT Black British people
British LGBT writers
English gay actors
21st-century English LGBT people